John Prince may refer to:

John Prince (politician) (1796–1870), Canadian judge and politician
John Prince (biographer) (1643–1723), Devonshire vicar and biographer
John Prince (cricketer) (born 1969), Saint Lucian cricketer.
John Prince (Unitarian) (1751–1836), see History of Unitarianism
John Prince (architect), see Buntingsdale Hall
John Critchley Prince (1808–1866), English poet
John Dyneley Prince (1868–1945), American linguist, diplomat and politician 
John E. Prince (1868-1947), American politician
John T. Prince (1871–1937), American actor

John Henry Prince (born 1914), American baseball player
Jack Prince (footballer), English footballer

See also
 Prince John (disambiguation)